Fedyayevskaya is a rural locality (a village) in Yavengskoye Rural Settlement, Vozhegodsky District, Vologda Oblast, Russia. The population was 39 as of 2002.

Geography 
Fedyayevskaya is located 31 km northeast of Vozhega (the district's administrative centre) by road. Olekhovskaya is the nearest rural locality.

References 

Rural localities in Vozhegodsky District